William Clark (August 1, 1770 – September 1, 1838) was an American explorer, soldier, Indian agent, and territorial governor. A native of Virginia, he grew up in pre-statehood Kentucky before later settling in what became the state of Missouri.

Along with Meriwether Lewis, Clark led the Lewis and Clark Expedition of 1804–1806 across the Louisiana Purchase to the Pacific Ocean, the first major effort to explore and map much of what is now the Western United States and to assert American claims to the Pacific Northwest. Before the expedition, he served in a militia and the United States Army. Afterward, he served in a militia and as governor of the Missouri Territory. From 1822 until his death in 1838, he served as Superintendent of Indian Affairs.

Early life
William Clark was born in Caroline County, Virginia, on August 1, 1770, the ninth of ten children of John and Ann Rogers Clark. His parents were natives of King and Queen County, and were of English and possibly Scots ancestry. The Clarks were planters in Virginia and owned several modest estates and a few slaves. They were members of the Anglican Church.

Clark did not have any formal education; like many of his contemporaries, he was tutored at home. In later years, he was self-conscious about his convoluted grammar and inconsistent spelling—he spelled "Sioux" 27 different ways in his journals of the Lewis and Clark Expedition—and sought to have his journals corrected before publication. The spelling of American English was not standardized in Clark's youth, but his vocabulary suggests he was well read.

Clark's five older brothers fought in Virginia units during the American Revolutionary War (1775–1783), but William was too young. His oldest brother, Jonathan Clark, served as a colonel during the war, rising to the rank of brigadier general in the Virginia militia years afterward. His second-oldest brother, George Rogers Clark, rose to the rank of general, spending most of the war in Kentucky fighting against British-allied American Indians. After the war, the two oldest Clark brothers made arrangements for their parents and family to relocate to Kentucky.

William, his parents, his three sisters, and the Clark family's slaves arrived in Kentucky in March 1785, having first traveled overland to Redstone Landing in present-day Brownsville, Pennsylvania. They completed the journey down the Ohio River by flatboat. The Clark family settled at "Mulberry Hill", a plantation along Beargrass Creek near Louisville. This was William Clark's primary home until 1803. In Kentucky, his older brother George Rogers Clark taught William wilderness survival skills.

Military career begins
Kentuckians fought the Northwest Indian War against American Indians, who were trying to preserve their territory north of the Ohio River. In 1789, 19-year-old William Clark joined a volunteer militia force under Major John Hardin. Clark kept a detailed journal of the expedition, beginning a lifelong practice. Hardin was advancing against the Wea Indians, who had been raiding settlements in Kentucky, on the Wabash River. In error, the undisciplined Kentucky militia attacked a peaceful Shawnee hunting camp, where they killed a total of eight men, women, and children.

In 1790, Clark was commissioned by General Arthur St. Clair, governor of the Northwest Territory, as a captain in the Clarksville, Indiana militia. One older source says he was sent on a mission to the Creek and Cherokee, whom the US hoped to keep out of the war, in the Southeast. His responsibilities are unclear. He may have visited New Orleans at that time. His travels prevented him from participating in General Josiah Harmar's disastrous campaign into the Northwest Territory that year.

In 1791, Clark served as an ensign and acting lieutenant with expeditions under generals Charles Scott and James Wilkinson. He enlisted in the Legion of the United States and was commissioned as a lieutenant on March 6, 1792, under Anthony Wayne. On September 4, 1792, he was assigned to the 4th Sub-Legion. He was involved in several skirmishes with Indians during the continuing Northwest Indian War. At the Battle of Fallen Timbers in 1794, Clark commanded a company of riflemen who drove back the enemy on the left flank, killing a number of Native Americans and Canadians. This decisive US victory brought the Northwest Indian War to an end. In 1795, Clark  was dispatched on a mission to New Madrid, Missouri. Clark also served as an adjutant and quartermaster while in the militia.

Lewis and Clark Expedition

William Clark resigned his commission on July 4, 1796, and retired due to poor health, although he was only 26 years old.  He returned to Mulberry Hill, his family's plantation near Louisville.

In 1803, Meriwether Lewis recruited Clark, then age 33, to share command of the newly formed Corps of Discovery, whose mission was to explore the territory of the Louisiana Purchase, establish trade with Native Americans, and consolidate the sovereignty of the US. They were to find a waterway from the US to the Pacific Ocean and claim the Oregon territory for the United States before European nations did. Clark spent three years on the expedition to the Pacific Coast. A slave owner known to deal harshly with his slaves, he brought York, one of his slaves, with him. The indigenous nations treated York with respect, and many of the Native Americans were interested in his appearance, which "played a key role in diplomatic relations".

Although Clark was refused a promotion to the rank of captain when Jefferson asked the Senate to appoint him, at Lewis' insistence, he exercised equal authority, and continued the mission. Clark concentrated chiefly on the drawing of maps, the management of the expedition's supplies, and leading hunting expeditions for game.

Indigenous nations and war
In 1807, President Jefferson appointed Clark as the brigadier general of the militia in the Louisiana Territory, and the US agent for Indian affairs. At the time, trade was a major goal and the US established the factory system. The government and its appointees licensed traders to set up trading posts in Native American territory. Native American relations were handled in what became the War Department. Clark set up his headquarters in St. Louis, Missouri, where he would live for most of the rest of his life.

There he became a member of the Freemasons, a secret fraternal group. The records of his initiation do not exist, but on September 18, 1809, Saint Louis Lodge No. 111 issued a traveling certificate for Clark.

As a reward for their contributions during their expedition to the Pacific Lewis and Clark were given government positions. Jefferson appointed Meriwether Lewis territorial governor of Upper Louisiana, commander-in-chief of the militia, and superintendent of Indian Affairs.  Although he was in charge of Indian affairs, Clark was under the supervision of the Governor of the Louisiana Territory. The governor had final say of all decisions made in the territory.  Although Clark had primary duties in dealing with the Native Americans, "the territorial governor held the title of ex officio superintendent of Indian affairs.

Clark's experiences during his cross-continent expedition gave him the tools to be the ideal candidate for a diplomat to the Native Americans.  That was Jefferson's motives behind giving Clark these duties, although it would not be until Madison's presidency that Clark's title became official.  President James Madison appointed Clark as Missouri territorial governor and thus ex officio superintendent of Indian affairs in that region, during the summers of 1808 and 1813. In the earlier period, Clark performed the same duties that he would have if he held the title.  During the years while Clark held position under Governor Lewis, he was continuously involved in decision-making with him. Clark was consulted on affairs on a regular basis. In Louisiana and Missouri, Clark served the United States government for the longest term in history as diplomat to the Native American peoples.

Indian diplomacy occupied much of Clark's time; the dutiful soldier and bureaucrat never wavered in his commitment to an expansionist national agenda that expected Indians to surrender their lands, abandon their traditional ways, and acquiesce to the dictates of the U.S. government. But he was aware of the consequences and he demonstrated genuine concern for the plight of destitute native people increasingly threatened with extinction, so much so that Indian-hating frontier settlers called him an "Indian lover". Clark's expeditions and frontier settlement gave him unique views and feelings toward Native Americans. He felt as though he held a firm hand when he had to, but at the same time he had passion towards them as people still deserving of rights.  At times he was said to be too compassionate.  Clark took his position as one of extreme importance to not only the government of the United States, but to the Native American people as well.

Clark recognized Indians' nationalism, their history, language, culture, and territory and negotiated treaties between the various nations and his. He tried to protect Indians and preserve their culture by removing them from the influences of white society, providing life-saving inoculations, having their portraits painted, and assembling a museum of Indian artifacts. At the same time, he removed Indians from their ancestral lands; encouraged federal "civilization" and "education" programs to change native lifestyles, religious beliefs, and cultural practices; and usually promoted the interests of American citizens over Indian needs and desires.

During the War of 1812, Clark led several campaigns, among them in 1814, one along the Mississippi River, up to the Prairie du Chien area. He established the short-lived Fort Shelby, the first post in what is now Wisconsin. Soon, the post was captured by the British. When the Missouri Territory was formed in 1813, Clark was appointed as the governor by President Madison. He was reappointed to the position by Madison in 1816, and in 1820 by President Monroe.

William Clark appeared before Supreme Court Judge John B.C. Lucas in St. Louis on July 6, 1813, to take the oath of office as governor of the Missouri Territory. Clark's road to a gubernatorial appointment was long and complex.  Upon Lewis' appointment by Jefferson, Clark backed him and at times filled the role of governor without holding official position, due to Lewis' complications in life, whether it was debt, loneliness, or drinking.  Upon the death of Lewis in 1809, Clark declined to take office for varying reasons.

By the time he was appointed governor, Clark appreciated his own capabilities and embraced them rather than turning them away. When he took office, America was involved in the War of 1812 with the British.  Clark feared the influence the British would have on the Native Americans.  British tactics would include the use of Indians as allies in the fighting against the United States. In return for British victory, Indians would either be able to continue to occupy their current land or receive lands back that were taken from them previously by the United States Government. Clark held office for the next seven years until he was voted out of office in 1820, in the first election after Missouri became a state. He was defeated by Alexander McNair.

In 1822, Clark was appointed Superintendent of Indian Affairs by President James Monroe, a new position created by Congress after the factory system was abolished. Clark served in that position until his death; his title changed with the creation of the Office of Indian Affairs in 1824 and finally the Bureau of Indian Affairs in 1829, both within the War Department. From 1824 to 1825, he was additionally appointed surveyor general of Illinois, Missouri, and the Territory of Arkansaw. It was around this time that Clark received a rare smoking pipe or calumet as a gift from a Potowatomi chief in Missouri. The pipe is held in the British Museum's collection.

As the Superintendent of Indian Affairs, Clark was the most important man on Native American matters west of the Mississippi. As superintendent at St. Louis, Clark took on some additional duties: he issued licenses and granted passports to traders and travelers; provided payments for injuries and injustices to both whites and Indians; invoked military force to arrest lawbreakers; prevented or terminated hostilities between tribes; removed unauthorized persons from Indian country or confiscated their property; established, marked, and surveyed boundaries; distributed annuities and made sure that treaty provisions were delivered; and conducted treaty councils.  Of the four superintendents of Indian affairs, the others were the governors of Michigan, Florida, and Arkansas territories; Clark had by far the largest superintendency.

Though Clark tried to maintain peaceful relations with indigenous nations and negotiated peace treaties, he was in charge of implementing President Andrew Jackson's Indian removal policy. He managed retaliation against Black Hawk and those allied with him in the Black Hawk War, when hostilities arose between them and the Americans. Clark issued "an extermination order", which he gave to Lewis Cass, a man who played a central role in Jackson's removal policy.

Clark believed in the Jeffersonian ideology in which assimilation would be the best course of action for Native Americans. However, in the end, relocation of the Indians from their native lands became the government's primary goal, and even the assimilated Five Civilized Tribes were moved by force (threat of military action). Clark's government position on Native American affairs kept him at the forefront of countless relocations.  He expressed sympathy for those uprooted tribes and promoted their interests as he understood them, nevertheless, he agreed with and implemented the policy of Indian removal, negotiating 37, or one-tenth, of all ratified treaties between American Indians and the United States. Over the course of his career, millions of acres passed from Indian to U.S. ownership through Clark's hand.

Marriage and family
After returning from his cross-country expedition, Clark married Julia Hancock on January 5, 1808, at Fincastle, Virginia.  They had five children: Meriwether Lewis Clark, Sr. (1809–1881), named after his friend and expedition partner; William Preston Clark (1811–1840); Mary Margaret Clark (1814–1821); George Rogers Hancock Clark (1816–1858), named after Clark's older brother; and John Julius Clark (1818–1831), named after his oldest brother Jonathan and Clark's wife.

After Julia's death in 1820, William Clark married Julia's first cousin, Harriet Kennerly Radford. They had three children together: Jefferson Kearny Clark (1824–1900), named after the president; Edmund Clark (1826–1827), named after another of his older brothers; and Harriet Clark, named after her mother (dates unknown; died as child). His second wife Harriet died in 1831.

Clark allegedly had a Nez Perce son, Tzi-Kal-Tza/Halahtookit. Clark also served as a guardian to Jean Baptiste Charbonneau, the son of Sacagawea and Toussaint Charbonneau.

Later life and death
William Clark died in St. Louis on September 1, 1838, at age 68. Clark was originally buried at his nephew John O'Fallon's property, in 1838. That area is now known as O'Fallon Park. The funeral procession stretched for more than a mile and cannons fired a military salute. The entire city of St. Louis mourned his passing.

Clark and six of his family members were later buried at Bellefontaine Cemetery on October 23, 1860. The monument that marks their graves, a  gray granite obelisk, was dedicated in 1904 on the centennial anniversary of the Louisiana Purchase. Clark's son, Jefferson Kearney Clark, designed the monument and paid $25,000 for it ($425,000 in 2005 figures). Jefferson Clark's wife had to complete the building of the monument after Jefferson died in 1900. Many years later, the monument was restored and rededicated on May 21, 2004, to mark the bicentennial of the Corps of Discovery's departure from St. Charles, Missouri. Members of the Shoshone, Osage, and Mandan tribes spoke at the ceremony, marking Clark's service to these Indian nations during the final years of his life.

Legacy and honors
 Clark was elected a member of the American Antiquarian Society in 1814.
 In 2001, President Bill Clinton promoted Clark to the rank of captain in the US Army posthumously. Descendants of Clark were there to mark the occasion.
 2004 rededication of the obelisk:  Although his family had established endowments to maintain his grave site, by the late 20th century, the grave site had fallen into disrepair. His descendants raised $100,000 to rehabilitate the obelisk. They celebrated the rededication with a ceremony May 21, 2004, on the bicentennial of the start of the Lewis and Clark Expedition. The ceremony was attended by a large gathering of Clark's descendants, reenactors in period dress, and leaders from the Osage Nation and the Lemhi band of the Shoshone.
 The western American plant genus Clarkia (in the evening primrose family Onagraceae), is named after him, as are the cutthroat trout (Oncorhynchus clarki ), and Clark's nutcracker (Nucifraga columbiana), a large passerine bird, in the family Corvidae.  All were species which Clark identified during the expedition. Clark's grebe (Aechmophorus clarkii ) was not named for William Clark, but for J.H. Clark who collected the first specimen.

 
Meriwether Lewis and William Clark were honored with a 3-cent stamp July 24, 1954 on the 150th anniversary of their expedition.
Both Lewis and Clark appear on the gold Lewis and Clark Exposition dollars minted for the Lewis and Clark Centennial Exposition.  Among the early United States commemorative coins, they were produced in both 1904 and 1905 and survive in relatively small numbers.
The Lewis and Clark expedition was celebrated on May 14, 2004, the 200th anniversary of its outset, depicting the two on a hilltop outlook. Two companion 37-cent stamps showed portraits of Meriwether Lewis and William Clark. A special 32-page booklet accompanied the issue in eleven cities along the route taken by the Corps of Discovery.
 Clark is included on the St. Louis Walk of Fame.
 Counties are named in his honor in six states: Arkansas, Idaho, Kentucky, Missouri, Montana, and Washington.
 The city of Clarkston, Washington is named for him.
 The Clarks River in western Kentucky is named for him, as is the Clark Fork in Montana and Idaho, and the Clarks Fork Yellowstone River in Montana and Wyoming.
 Two U.S. Navy Vessels have been named in honor of Clark; the Polaris nuclear submarine USS Lewis and Clark and the supply ship USNS Lewis and Clark were named for him and Lewis.
 The Clark Bridge, a cable-stayed bridge across the Mississippi River between West Alton, Missouri and Alton, Illinois, was named after him.
 Lewis and Clark Community College, in the Metro East region of Illinois, was named for the explorers.
 Lewis and Clark Law School in Portland, Oregon, was named after Lewis and Clark.
 Lewis-Clark State College in Lewiston, Idaho, is named for the two explorers.
 Lewis and Clark Elementary School in Mandan, North Dakota, is named for the two explorers.
 Lewis and Clark College in Portland, Oregon is named for the two explorers.
 Lewis & Clark Elementary School in Fargo, North Dakota is named for the two explorers.
 In 1965, Clark was inducted into the Hall of Great Westerners of the National Cowboy & Western Heritage Museum.

See also
 York (explorer)

References

General references
 Buckley, Jay H. William Clark: Indian Diplomat.  Norman: University of Oklahoma Press, 2008. .
 Foley, William E. Wilderness Journey: The Life of William Clark. Columbia: University of Missouri Press, 2004. .
 Jones, Landon Y. William Clark and the Shaping of the West, New York: Hill and Wang, 2004. .

Further reading
 The Unknown Travels and Dubious Pursuits of William Clark by Jo Ann Trogdon, 2015, University of Missouri Press

External links

 "The Clarks: The First Family of the Frontier," 8thVirginia.com
 Biography from Indiana Historical Bureau
 
 
 
 The Journals of Lewis and Clark, hypertext, American Studies at the University of Virginia.
 The Journals of William Clark , Missouri History Museum
 William Clark documents and images, including records of the St. Louis Superintendency of Indian Affairs on Kansas Memory, digital portal of the Kansas Historical Society
 "Writings of Lewis and Clark" from C-SPAN's American Writers: A Journey Through History
 The Paradox of Historical Fiction: Finding Truth in the Absence of Fact
 Lewis and Clark Expedition Maps and Receipt. Yale Collection of Western Americana, Beinecke Rare Book and Manuscript Library.
 William Clark Field Notes. Yale Collection of Western Americana, Beinecke Rare Book and Manuscript Library.
 Louis Starr Collection Concerning the Field Notes of William Clark. Yale Collection of Western Americana, Beinecke Rare Book and Manuscript Library.

1770 births
1838 deaths
American explorers
American Freemasons
American naturalists
American Episcopalians
American people of English descent
American people of Scottish descent
Burials at Bellefontaine Cemetery
Explorers of North America
Explorers of Oregon
Governors of Missouri Territory
Lewis and Clark Expedition people
People from Caroline County, Virginia
American people of the Northwest Indian War
United States Army officers
United States Indian agents
Virginia colonial people
Members of the American Antiquarian Society
American slave owners
Explorers of Montana
Military personnel from St. Louis
Scientists from Virginia
People from Louisville, Kentucky